Sir Henry Peyton, 3rd Baronet (30 June 1804 – 18 February 1866), was an English Conservative Party politician.

He was a Member (MP) of the Parliament of the United Kingdom for Woodstock from 25 Jul 1837 until May 1838 .

References

External links 
 

1804 births
1866 deaths
Baronets in the Baronetage of Great Britain
Conservative Party (UK) MPs for English constituencies
UK MPs 1837–1841